Nunoike Church, officially the Cathedral of St. Peter and St. Paul, is the main cathedral of the Roman Catholic Diocese of Nagoya in central Japan.

History 
The cathedral was completed in 1962. The architectural style is Gothic revival.  The two belfries with their tall spires can be seen from a distance.

Masses are held in many languages, including English and Tagalog, catering to the expatriate community in Nagoya. Located next to the cathedral is St. Mary College, an English language school. 

Nearest subway stations are Shinsakae-machi on the Higashiyama Line or Kuramamichi station on the Sakuradori Line.

References

External links 

 Homepage of Nunoike Church

Churches in Nagoya
Roman Catholic churches completed in 1962
Roman Catholic cathedrals in Japan
20th-century Roman Catholic church buildings in Japan